Contaco is a small settlement, beach and balneario at the coast of Osorno Province, southern Chile. It is located south of Pucatrihue at the outflow of Contaco River into the Pacific Ocean.

References

Beaches of Chile
Landforms of Los Lagos Region
Populated coastal places in Chile
Populated places in Osorno Province